State Trunk Highway 193 (often called Highway 193, STH-193 or WIS 193) is a  state highway in the Town of Eagle in Richland County in the US state of Wisconsin that runs north–south from the south of, to the east of, the unincorporated community of Balmoral, several miles north of the village of Muscoda.

Route description
WIS 193 starts at a T-intersection with WIS 60. The highway runs northward from this intersection through some farm fields. Near the Mill Creek crossing, the roadway passes through some woods before it turns easterly through more fields. South-southeast of the Dawson Cemetery, WIS 193 terminates at its intersection with WIS 80 at a T-intersection.

History
The first highway to carry the WIS 193 designation was given the moniker in 1947 when  of roads in Florence County in the northern part of the state. This highway was supplanted by an extension of WIS 70 in 1949. Shortly afterwards, the current highway was designated; the routing has not substantially changed since.

Major intersections

See also

References

External links

193
Transportation in Richland County, Wisconsin